James Landy (October 13, 1813 – July 25, 1875) was a Democratic member of the U.S. House of Representatives from Pennsylvania.

Biography
James Landy was born in Northern Liberties District in Philadelphia, Pennsylvania.  He attended the public schools and studied law, but abandoned it later and engaged in mercantile pursuits.  He was a member of the board of school commissioners in 1845.

Landy was elected as a Democrat to the Thirty-fifth Congress.  He was an unsuccessful candidate for reelection in 1858.  He was elected chief commissioner of highways in 1862.  He died in Philadelphia in 1875. Originally interred in Monument Cemetery, he was reburied in Lawnview Cemetery in 1956.

References

1813 births
1875 deaths
Burials at Lawnview Memorial Park
Burials at Monument Cemetery
Politicians from Philadelphia
Democratic Party members of the United States House of Representatives from Pennsylvania
19th-century American politicians